Redetermination may refer to:

 Appeal, the process in which legal cases are reviewed, where parties request a formal change to an official decision, functioning as a process for both error correction and clarifying and interpreting law
 Redetermination of Chemical structure